Anu Kaljurand (born 16 April 1969) is a retired Estonian heptathlete.

Career
She finished seventeenth in the heptathlon at the 1992 Summer Olympics and won the gold medal at the 1992 NCAA Division I Outdoor Track and Field Championships. Her score of 6142 points was her lifetime best, and was unmatched at the Championships since Jackie Joyner in 1983.

She also competed individually in the heptathlon events, winning the silver medal in the long jump at both the 1986 World Junior Championships and the 1988 World Junior Championships. She competed in the 100 metres hurdles at the 1992 Summer Olympics without reaching the final. She also holds the world U18 indoor best in long jump with 6.61.

Personal life
In 1990 she enrolled at Brigham Young University as the first Soviet citizen to do so. She competed in athletics for the BYU Cougars. Graduating in Russian from Brigham Young University in 1993, she later got an MBA at Westminster College in 1997. Kaljurand is living with high jumper Marko Turban, they have two children.

References

External links
 

1969 births
Living people
Athletes from Tallinn
Soviet female long jumpers
Estonian female hurdlers
Estonian heptathletes
Athletes (track and field) at the 1992 Summer Olympics
Olympic athletes of Estonia
Soviet expatriate sportspeople in the United States
Estonian expatriate sportspeople in the United States
BYU Cougars women's track and field athletes
Brigham Young University alumni
Westminster College (Utah) alumni